Villa Isabela is a town in the Puerto Plata province of the Dominican Republic.  It lies 9 km south of the site of La Isabela, where Christopher Columbus founded a settlement in 1493.

References

Sources 
 – World-Gazetteer.com

Populated places in Puerto Plata Province
Municipalities of the Dominican Republic

es:Villa Isabela